Tennis competitions at the 2009 Games of the Small States of Europe in Cyprus were held 2–6 June 2009 at the National Tennis Centre in Nicosia. The Plexicushion surface rendered the event a hardcourt tournament.

Medal summary

Medal table

Events

External links
Tennis Schedule & Results
Official website

 
2009 Games of the Small States of Europe events
2009
Games of the Small States of Europe